This article contains information about the literary events and publications of 1895.

Events
January – The Ottoman illustrated magazine Servet-i Fünun is taken over by Tevfik Fikret, who turns it into a vehicle for Edebiyat-ı Cedide ("New Literature"). These writers are committed to conservatism and Ottomanism, rather than Turkish nationalism, but also favor Westernization. They use a "recondite and obscure" Ottoman language within the framework of aestheticism.
January–May – H. G. Wells' first "scientific romance", the novella The Time Machine, is published serially in The New Review (London). The first book editions are published by Henry Holt and Company in New York on May 7 and Heinemann in London on May 29.

January 3 – The première of Oscar Wilde's comedy An Ideal Husband takes place at the Haymarket Theatre in London.
January 5
The première of Henry James's historical drama Guy Domville held at St James's Theatre in London is booed.
A. E. Waite ceases to publish and edit his occult periodical The Unknown World.
January 12 – The National Trust for Places of Historic Interest or Natural Beauty is registered in England and begins acquiring properties and making them accessible to the public. Carlyle's House in Chelsea is one of the first to open.
February – The Bookman (New York), a monthly, is first published by Dodd, Mead and Company with Harry Thurston Peck as editor. It publishes the first bestseller list, which is headed by Frank R. Stockton's novel The Adventures of Captain Horn.
February 14 – Oscar Wilde's last play, the comedy The Importance of Being Earnest, opens at St James's Theatre, London.
February 18 – The Marquess of Queensberry (father of Lord Alfred Douglas, Oscar Wilde's lover), leaves a calling card at the Albemarle Club in London inscribed: "For Oscar Wilde, posing somdomite", i. e. sodomite, inducing Wilde to charge him with criminal libel. In a meeting on March 25 at the Café Royal in London, Frank Harris and George Bernard Shaw fail to dissuade Wilde from proceeding with the action.
March 4 – George du Maurier's play, Trilby, based on his novel of the same name, serialised in 1894 and first published in book form in 1895, opens at the Boston Museum in the United States, with a New York première on April 15 at the Garden Theatre. Wilton Lackaye plays Svengali and Virginia Harned the title rôle. 
April/May – Pan, a German arts and literary magazine, is first published, in Berlin.
April 3–5 – Queensberry is acquitted in the libel case of Wilde v Queensberry at the Old Bailey in London. Evidence of Wilde's homosexual relationships with young men renders him liable to criminal prosecution under the Labouchere Amendment, while the Libel Act 1843 renders him legally liable for the considerable expenses Queensberry has incurred in his defence, leaving Wilde penniless.
April 6 – Oscar Wilde is arrested at the Cadogan Hotel, London, in the company of Robbie Ross, for "unlawfully committing acts of gross indecency with certain male persons". He is detained on remand in Holloway Prison.
April 29 – Joseph Conrad's novel Almayer's Folly is published in London by T. Fisher Unwin, as Conrad's first published work, after retirement from his career at sea. It marks the first appearance of his pseudonym.
May 23 – Representatives of the Astor Library and Lenox Library, with the backing of Samuel J. Tilden, agree to merge and form the New York Public Library.
May 25
After a retrial of the criminal case of Regina v. Wilde at the Old Bailey, Oscar Wilde is convicted of gross indecency and taken to Pentonville Prison to begin a two-year sentence of hard labour. In June he requests to read in his cell Pater's The Renaissance, Augustine's Confessions and works by Baudelaire and Newman. On November 21 he is transferred to Reading Gaol.
Henry Irving becomes the first English actor to be knighted as such.
June 21 – William Poel's newly formed Elizabethan Stage Society, created to promote productions of plays by Shakespeare and his contemporaries in the assumed style of the English Renaissance theatre, gives its first performance, at Burlington Hall.
September 7 – The stage version of Trilby (see March 4) has its UK première at the Theatre Royal, Manchester, with a London première on October 30 at the Haymarket Theatre), with Herbert Beerbohm Tree and Dorothea Baird. The play is so successful that Tree can use the profits to build Her Majesty's Theatre. It also popularises the trilby hat.
October
The American Historical Review appears for the first time.
Stephen Crane's American Civil War novel The Red Badge of Courage is first published in an abridged book format by D. Appleton & Company in New York.
Rudyard Kipling publishes the story "Mowgli Leaves the Jungle Forever" in The Cosmopolitan illustrated magazine in the United States, concluding the series collected in The Second Jungle Book, published in England in November.
November 1 – Thomas Hardy's last completed novel, Jude the Obscure is published by Osgood, McIlvaine, and Co. in London, dated 1896, on completion of an expurgated serialization under the title Hearts Insurgent in Harper's Magazine. It is strongly criticized on moral grounds. Hardy later claims that Walsham How, Bishop of Wakefield, burned a copy.
c. December – Ioseb Besarionis dze Jughashvili, the future Joseph Stalin, publishes his romantic poems in the newspaper Iveria, receiving accolades from a senior writer, Ilia Chavchavadze.
December 19 – Robert Frost marries Elinor Miriam White at Lawrence, Massachusetts.
unknown dates
Abdallah bin Hemedi bin Ali Ajjemy's Habari za Wakilindi is the first novel to be published in the Swahili language.
Castello Holford's utopian novel Aristopia: A Romance-History of the New World, appears in Boston as the first full-length alternate history in English.
Ernest Thayer recites Casey at the Bat at a Harvard class reunion, appearing to resolve a mystery about the poem's authorship.
The first edition of the Times Atlas of the World is published at the office of The Times newspaper in London.
Hall Caine travels in the United States and Canada, representing the U.K. Society of Authors. He obtains international copyright concessions from the Dominion Parliament.

New books

Fiction
Grant Allen
The British Barbarians
The Woman Who Did
John Kendrick Bangs – A House-Boat on the Styx
Mary Elizabeth Braddon – Sons of Fire
Rhoda Broughton – Scylla or Charybdis?
Robert W. Chambers – The King in Yellow
Joseph Conrad – Almayer's Folly
Marie Corelli – The Sorrows of Satan
Stephen Crane – The Red Badge of Courage
Victoria Crosse – The Woman Who Didn't
Grazia Deledda – Anime oneste (Honest soul)
Ménie Muriel Dowie – Gallia
Alice Dunbar – Violets and Other Tales (short stories and poetry)
Isabelle Eberhardt as Nicolas Podolinsky – "Infernalia" (short story)
J. Meade Falkner – The Lost Stradivarius
Antonio Fogazzaro – The Little World of the Past (Piccolo mondo antico)
Ludwig Ganghofer – Hubertus Castle
Hamlin Garland – Rose of Dutcher's Coolly
George Gissing
Eve's Ransom
The Paying Guest
Sleeping Fires
Thomas Hardy – Jude the Obscure
Robert Hichens – An Imaginative Man
Castello Holford – Aristopia
William Wilson Hunter – The Old Missionary (book publication)
Joris-Karl Huysmans – En Route
Henry James – Terminations (collection)
Olha Kobylianska – Tsarivna (Princess)
John Uri Lloyd – Etidorhpa, or, the end of the earth: the strange history of a mysterious being and the account of a remarkable journey
George MacDonald – Lilith
Ian Maclaren – The Days of Auld Lang Syne
George Meredith – The Amazing Marriage
Dmitry Merezhkovsky – The Death of the Gods
Kálmán Mikszáth – St. Peter's Umbrella (Szent Péter esernyője)
Arthur Morrison – Chronicles of Martin Hewitt
Gustavus W. Pope – Journey to Venus
Bolesław Prus – Pharaoh (Faraon; serialization begins)
Emilio Salgari – I misteri della jungla nera
Henryk Sienkiewicz – Quo Vadis
Leo Tolstoy – Master and Man (Хозяин и работник)
Jules Verne – Propeller Island (L'Île à hélice)
H. G. Wells – The Time Machine

Children and young people
Lewis Carroll – Sylvie and Bruno
G. E. Farrow – The Wallypug of Why
Ellen Thorneycroft Fowler – The Young Pretenders (reissued 2007)
Rudyard Kipling
The Brushwood Boy
The Second Jungle Book
L. T. Meade – A Princess of the Gutter
Mary Louisa Molesworth (Mrs. Molesworth) – The Carved Lions
Emilio Salgari – I Misteri della Jungla Nera (The Mystery of the Black Jungle – first in the Sandokan series of eleven books)
Florence Kate Upton – The Adventures of Two Dutch Dolls and a Golliwogg
Alice Zimmern – Greek History for Young Readers

Drama
Tristan Bernard – Les Pieds nickelés
Joaquín Dicenta – Juan José
José Echegaray – El estigma
Hulda Garborg – Mødre
Alfred Jarry – Caesar Antichrist
Maurice Maeterlinck – Interior (Intérieur, verse play for marionettes, first production)
Jules Renard – La Demande
Arthur Schnitzler – Liebelei
Tsubouchi Shōyō (坪内 逍遥) – Kiri Hitoha (A Paulownia Leaf, writing complete)
Frank Wedekind – Earth Spirit
Oscar Wilde – The Importance of Being Earnest
Hall Caine – The Manxman (the Philip version)

Poetry
Pauline Johnson – The White Wampum
Giovanni Marradi – Ballati moderne
Banjo Paterson – The Man from Snowy River and Other Verses
See also 1895 in poetry

Non-fiction
Lord Acton – A Lecture on the Study of History
Francis Darwin – The Elements of Botany
Annetta Seabury Dresser – The Philosophy of P. P. Quimby
Gustave Le Bon – Psychologie des foules (Psychology of Crowds)
Friedrich Nietzsche – Der Antichrist (written 1888)

Births
January 24 – Eugen Roth, German poet and lyricist (died 1976)
February 14 – Max Horkheimer, German philosopher (died 1973)
February 28 – Marcel Pagnol, French novelist (died 1974)
March 29 – Ernst Jünger, German novelist (died 1998)
April 15 – Corrado Alvaro, Italian ''verismo' writer and journalist (died 1968)
April 17 – Ion Vinea, Romanian poet and novelist (died 1964)
April 20 – Henry de Montherlant, French novelist and dramatist (suicide 1972)
April 23 – Ngaio Marsh, New Zealand detective fiction writer and theatre director (died 1982)
May 3 – Ernst Kantorowicz, German historian (died 1963)
May 8 – Edmund Wilson, American literary critic (died 1972)
May 9 – Lucian Blaga, Romanian poet and philosopher (died 1961)
May 11 – Jiddu Krishnamurti, Indian philosopher, speaker, and writer (died 1986)
May 19 – Charles Sorley, Scottish-born poet (killed in action 1915)
May 24 – Marcel Janco, Romanian–Israeli artist, art theorist, essayist and poet (died 1984)
June 16 – Warren Lewis, Irish-born historian (died 1973)
June 27 – Anna Banti, Italian art historian, critic, and translator (died 1985)
June 29 – Alice Lardé de Venturino, Salvadoran poet and writer (died 1983)
July 14 – F. R. Leavis, English literary critic (died 1978)
July 24 – Robert Graves, English poet and novelist (died 1985)
August 19 – Arnolt Bronnen, Austrian playwright and director (died 1959)
September 7 – Jacques Vaché, French writer, associated with Surrealism (died 1919)
September 16 – Zainal Abidin Ahmad, Malayan nationalist writer (died 1973)
September 21 – Sergei Yesenin, Russian poet (died 1925)
October 3 – Giovanni Comisso, Italian writer (died 1969)
October 6 – Caroline Gordon, American novelist and critic (died 1981)
October 17 – C. H. B. Kitchin, English novelist (died 1967)
October 20 – Alexandru Rosetti, Romanian linguist, editor and memoirist (died 1990)
October 31 – B. H. Liddell Hart, English military historian (died 1970)
November 1 – David Jones, Anglo-Welsh poet and artist (died 1974)
November 16 – Michael Arlen, Armenian novelist and short story writer (died 1956)
December 1 – Henry Williamson, English novelist (died 1977)
December 9 – Vivian de Sola Pinto, English poet, literary critic, and historian (died 1969)
December 14 – Paul Éluard, French poet (died 1952)
December 24 – Noel Streatfeild, English novelist and children's writer (died 1986)
December 28 – Carol Ryrie Brink, American novelist and children's author (died 1981)

Deaths
January 3 – Mary Torrans Lathrap, American author and reformer (born 1838)
January 13 – John Robert Seeley, English historian and essayist (born 1834)
January 15 – Lady Charlotte Guest, English translator of Welsh literature (born 1812)
February 16 – Camilla Dufour Crosland, English writer and poet (born 1812)
February 19 – Auguste Vacquerie, French journalist (born 1819)
February 20 – Frederick Douglass, African-American abolitionist, orator and writer (born 1818)
March 5 – Nikolai Leskov, Russian journalist, novelist and short story writer (born 1831)
March 15 – Cesare Cantù, Italian historian (born 1804)
March 22 – Henry Coppée, American historian and biographer (born 1821)
April 3 – Gustav Freytag, German novelist and dramatist (born 1816)
April 17 – Jorge Isaacs, Colombian writer, politician and explorer (born 1837)
April 25 – Emily Thornton Charles, American newspaper founder (born 1845)
April 26 – Eric Stenbock, German poet (born 1858)
May 4 – Lillian Spender (née Headland), English novelist (born 1835)
May 26 – Ahmet Cevdet Pasha, Ottoman historian and legal writer (born 1822)
 June 27 – Sophie Adlersparre, Swedish feminist and magazine editor (born 1823)
August 1 – Heinrich von Sybel, German historian (born 1817)
August 5 – Friedrich Engels, German socialist writer (born 1820)
September 29 – William Grainge, English local historian (born 1818)
October 14 – Clara Doty Bates, American author (born 1838)
November 4 – Eugene Field, American children's author (born 1850)
November 27 – Alexandre Dumas, fils, French novelist and dramatist (born 1824)
November 28 – L. S. Bevington, English anarchist poet and essayist (born 1845)

References

 
Years of the 19th century in literature